Clements is an unincorporated community in Chase County, Kansas, United States.  It is located about half way between Strong City and Florence near the intersection of U.S. Route 50 highway and G Rd.

History

Early history

For many millennia, the Great Plains of North America was inhabited by nomadic Native Americans.  From the 16th century to 18th century, the Kingdom of France claimed ownership of large parts of North America.  In 1762, after the French and Indian War, France secretly ceded New France to Spain, per the Treaty of Fontainebleau.

19th century

In 1802, Spain returned most of the land to France.  In 1803, most of the land for modern day Kansas was acquired by the United States from France as part of the  Louisiana Purchase for 2.83 cents per acre.

In 1806, Zebulon Pike led the Pike Expedition westward from St Louis, Missouri, of which part of their journey followed the Cottonwood River through Chase County near the current community of Clements.

In 1854, the Kansas Territory was organized, then in 1861 Kansas became the 34th U.S. state.  In 1859, Chase County was established within the Kansas Territory, which included the land for modern day Clements.

In 1862, a post office opened in nearby Silver Creek (an extinct town).

In 1871, the Atchison, Topeka and Santa Fe Railway built a main line east–west through the community. In 1996, it merged with Burlington Northern Railroad and renamed to the current BNSF Railway.  Most locals still refer to this railroad as the "Santa Fe".

In 1881, the post office from Silver Creek was moved to the rail community of Crawfordsville, which was renamed in 1884 to Clements. The post office was discontinued in 1988.

In 1887, the nearby Clements Stone Arch Bridge was completed over the Cottonwood River.

20th century
There have been numerous floods during the history of Clements.  In June and July 1951, due to heavy rains, rivers and streams flooded numerous cities in Kansas, including Clements.  Many reservoirs and levees were built in Kansas as part of a response to the Great Flood of 1951.

Geography
Clements is located in the Flint Hills of the Great Plains.  The Cottonwood River runs through the south part of the community.

Area attractions
Clements has one listing on the National Register of Historic Places listings in Chase County, Kansas (NRHP). The Clements Stone Arch Bridge was built of native limestone across Cottonwood River in 1887.

Education
The community is served by Chase County USD 284 public school district.  It has two schools.

Infrastructure

Transportation
U.S. Route 50 highway and BNSF Railway pass through Clements.

See also
 La Junta Subdivision, branch of the BNSF Railway

References

Further reading

External links

Historical and Photos	
 Clements - A "Quiet" town of Chase County, Kansas, History and photographs
 Clements Stone Arch Bridge, archive of official website	
 Kansas Photo Tour - Clements Stone Bridge, archive of kansasphototour.com
 Chase County maps: Current, Historic, KDOT

Unincorporated communities in Kansas
Unincorporated communities in Chase County, Kansas
1884 establishments in Kansas
Populated places established in 1884